Ditsobotla Local Municipality is a local municipality in Ngaka Modiri Molema District Municipality, North West Province, South Africa. The seat of local municipality is Lichtenburg.

Main places
The 2001 census divided the municipality into the following main places:

Politics 

The municipal council consists of thirty-nine members elected by mixed-member proportional representation. Twenty councillors are elected by first-past-the-post voting in twenty wards, while the remaining nineteen are chosen from party lists so that the total number of party representatives is proportional to the number of votes received. In the election of 1 November 2021 the African National Congress (ANC) won a majority of twenty-one seats on the council.
The following table shows the results of the election.

After infighting between two African National Congress factions, resulting in the council having two mayors and two speakers, the council was dissolved by the national and provincial governments. A by-election to elect an entirely new council will be held in December 2022.

References

External links 
 Official site

Local municipalities of the Ngaka Modiri Molema District Municipality